Unprisoned is a 2023 comedy television series created by Tracy McMillan, starring Kerry Washington and Delroy Lindo. The series is produced by Onyx Collective and distributed on Hulu in the United States.

Cast
Kerry Washington as Paige Alexander
Jordyn McIntosh as Little Paige
Delroy Lindo as Edwin Alexander
Marque Richardson as Mal
Faly Rakotohavana as Finn
Brenda Strong as Nadine
Jee Young Han as Esti
Edwin Lee Gibson as Fox
Tim Daly as Bill

Episodes

Reception
The Entertainment Weekly review said "Delroy Lindo is so good it should be illegal"; Variety called it a "family story with genuine heart"; The Hollywood Reporter called it "messy but fascinating."

References

External links

2023 American television series debuts
2020s American comedy television series
English-language television shows
Hulu original programming
Films set in Minnesota
Television series by ABC Studios
Television series by Anonymous Content